Édouard Drouyn de Lhuys (19 November 1805 – 1 March 1881) was a French diplomat. Born in Paris,  he was educated at the Lycée Louis-le-Grand.  The scion of a wealthy and noble house, he excelled in rhetoric.  He quickly became interested in politics and diplomacy.

Biography
He was ambassador to the Netherlands and Spain, and distinguished himself by his opposition to Guizot. Drouyn de Lhuys served as Minister of Foreign Affairs from 1848 to 1849 in the first government of Odilon Barrot.  In Barrot's second government, he was replaced by Alexis de Tocqueville, and was appointed ambassador to Great Britain.  He returned briefly as foreign minister for a few days in January 1851, and then returned permanently in the summer of 1852, becoming the first foreign minister of the Second Empire.  He resigned his post in 1855, during the Crimean War, when the peace preliminaries he had agreed to in consultation with the British and Austrians at Vienna were rejected by Napoleon III.

Drouyn de Lhuys returned to power 7 years later, in 1862, when foreign minister Édouard Thouvenel resigned over differences with Napoleon on Italian affairs.  Drouyn was thus foreign minister in the lead-up to the Austro-Prussian War. He commented that, "the Emperor has immense desires and limited abilities. He wants to do extraordinary things but is only capable of extravagances."
In the aftermath of that war, which was disastrous to French interests in Europe, Drouyn resigned and withdrew into private life.

Honours 
 : Knight of the Illustrious Royal Order of Saint Januarius, 1852
 : Grand Cross of the Grand Ducal Hessian Order of Ludwig, 11 February 1853
 : Grand Cross of the Royal and Distinguished Order of Charles III, 27 January 1854
 : Grand Cordon of the Order of Leopold (civil division), 23 July 1854
  Grand Duchy of Tuscany: Grand Cross of the Order of Saint Joseph
 : Grand Cross of the Royal Hungarian Order of Saint Stephen, 1855
 : Grand Cross of the Imperial Order of Guadalupe, 1864
   Sweden-Norway: Knight of the Royal Order of the Seraphim, 27 March 1865
 : Grand Cross of the Order of Saint-Charles, 24 December 1865

References

Obituary. Edouard Drouyn-de-Lhuys. The New York Times, 3 March 1881. Accessed 7 October 2008
The Illustrated London News, May 19, 1855.

Further reading
 Schnerb, Robert. "Napoleon III and the Second French Empire." Journal of Modern History 8.3 (1936): 338–355. online
 Schulz, Matthias. "A Balancing Act: Domestic Pressures and International Systemic Constraints in the Foreign Policies of the Great Powers, 1848–1851." German History 21.3 (2003): 319–346.
 Spencer, Warren Frank. Edouard Drouyn de Lhuys and the Foreign Policy of the Second Empire (PhD dissertation University of Pennsylvania, 1955).

See also
 Internationalization of the Danube River

1805 births
1881 deaths
Politicians from Paris
Party of Order politicians
Bonapartists
French Foreign Ministers
Members of the 6th Chamber of Deputies of the July Monarchy
Members of the 7th Chamber of Deputies of the July Monarchy
Members of the 1848 Constituent Assembly
Members of the National Legislative Assembly of the French Second Republic
French Senators of the Second Empire
Ambassadors of France to the United Kingdom
19th-century French diplomats
French people of the Crimean War
Lycée Louis-le-Grand alumni
University of Paris alumni
Members of the Académie des sciences morales et politiques
Grand Crosses of the Order of Saint-Charles
Ambassadors of France to Spain
Ambassadors of France to the Netherlands
Grand Crosses of the Order of Saint Stephen of Hungary
Grand Crosses of the Order of the Dannebrog
Knights Grand Cross of the Order of the Immaculate Conception of Vila Viçosa
Commanders of the Order of Isabella the Catholic
Recipients of the Order of the Medjidie, 1st class
Knights Grand Cross of the Order of Saints Maurice and Lazarus